The Hamilton School District is a school district in Waukesha County, Wisconsin, USA.

It serves all of and Butler, most of Lannon and Sussex, parts of Lisbon and Menomonee Falls, and a small part of Pewaukee.

The population is estimated at 40,000. Student enrollment is approximately 5,000.

School sites in the district
The Hamilton School District has eight schools that serve students from pre-kindergarten through high school:

4 year old kindergarten
An optional half-day kindergarten program is offered to 4-year-olds at Willow Springs Learning Center. Willow Springs also houses a private daycare provider, enabling parents to pay for daycare services for their children during the portion of the day when they are not participating in the kindergarten program.

Elementary schools
The four elementary schools focus on the basic skills of reading, writing, mathematics, science and social studies. Each school has a full-time reading-writing specialist and library-media specialist. Specialists also provide instruction in art, music and physical education. Guidance counselors offer a developmental guidance program. The Hamilton School District has four elementary schools that serve students from kindergarten through fourth grade.

Intermediate School
Silver Spring Intermediate School is a newly added addition to the growing Hamilton School District that now holds grades 5 and 6,  with elementary schools serving students in 5K - grade 4. It was formally dedicated in a public ceremony on Aug. 26, 2019, on the school's grounds.

Middle school
A true middle-level education philosophy exists at Templeton Middle School. It was named for two consecutive years as a “middle school of excellence” by the state Wisconsin Department of Public Instruction and the Association of Wisconsin School Administrators. Templeton uses a house system, which groups students with a core team of academic teachers who collaboratively plan instruction, teach and meet student needs. The structure promotes interdisciplinary instruction, integrated units, team teaching, positive student-teacher relationships and flexible scheduling. The school was also the subject of a diss track by Lil Beeter, which was his first song.

High school
Hamilton High School has a program that serves college-bound students (98.5% graduation rate), as well as those who plan to attend technical school or enter the world of work. The school has advanced placement and world language courses and an honors program. Co-op and youth apprenticeship programs allow students to apply theory to real world work settings.

Schools

The Hamilton School Board
Seven Hamilton School Board members are elected to serve three-year terms. While placed in office by a vote of the entire district, members are elected from five specified district areas and two at-large positions.

Meetings are the first Tuesday (curriculum meeting) and the third Monday (regular meeting) each month. The agenda is posted and submitted to local newspapers prior to each meeting.

References

External links
Hamilton School District website

School districts in Wisconsin
Education in Waukesha County, Wisconsin
School districts established in 1961
1961 establishments in Wisconsin